Andrew Benke (born 3 September 1938) is an English cricketer. He played nineteen first-class matches for Cambridge University Cricket Club in 1962.

See also
 List of Cambridge University Cricket Club players

References

External links
 

1938 births
Living people
English cricketers
Cambridge University cricketers
Cricketers from Southampton